Peter Croes (born March 16, 1984) is a triathlete from Belgium, specialized in the Olympic distance. He is a double titleholder at the European Junior Triathlon Championships, and is also currently ranked no. 73 in the world by the International Triathlon Union.

Born in Bonheiden, Croes started out his sporting career as a football player in his early childhood, until he discovered triathlon at age twelve in a local school. From then on, he began competing in various local and national triathlon championships at the peak of his career. His first major success happened when he came third at the 2001 European Junior Triathlon Championships in Karlovy Vary, Czech Republic, followed by his winning triumphs at the same event twice, in 2002 and in 2003. Because of his repeated successes in the championships, Croes eventually made his international debut in triathlon for the ITU World Cup in Madrid, where he finished fifth.

Croes was also selected for the national team, together with his teammate Axel Zeebroek, at the 2008 Summer Olympics in Beijing. According to the International Triathlon Union, he was ranked no. 52 on the list of Olympic qualifiers, which guaranteed him a place for the Olympics, because of his fifth-place finish at the ITU World Cup in New Plymouth, New Zealand. In the men's triathlon, he finished only in twenty-seventh place with a time of 1:51:40.

Results

Triathlon 
2001:  EC Juniors in Karlsbad
2002:  EC Juniors in Győr
2003:  EC Juniors in Karlovy Vary
2003: 5th WC Juniors in Queenstown
2004: 5th ITU World Cup in Madrid
2005: 17th WC Olympic distance in Gamagori - 1:51.16
2006:  European Cup in San Remo
2006: 6th ITU World Cup in Corner Brook
2006: 19th EC Olympic distance in Autun - 2:00.52
2006: 63rd WC Olympic distance in Lausanne - 2:02.02
2007: 31st EC Olympic distance in Kopenhagen - 1:54.41
2008: 5th ITU World Cup in New Plymouth
2008: 16th EC Olympic distance in Lisbon - 1:55.45
2008: 27th Olympic Games in Beijing -  1:51.40.94
2009: 12th EC Olympic distance in Holten - 1:45.35
2009: 19th ITU World Cup in Madrid - 1:54.44
2009: 20th ITU World Cup in Washington D.C. - 1:52.27
2010: 5th ITU Triathlon World Cup Huatulco - 01:50:22
2010: 14th ITU Elite Sprint Triathlon World Championships Lausanne - 0:53:59
2010: 6th ITU Triathlon Premium European Cup Brasschaat - 1:45:13
2011: 8th ITU Triathlon Pan American Cup Ixtapa - 1:57:55
2011: 9th Cremona ITU Sprint Triathlon European Cup Cremona - 0:55:54

Duathlon
2003:  WC Juniors in Affoltern
2004: 4th WC under-23 in Geel

References

External links
Blog van Peter Croes en Angie Bland
Results the-sports.org
Profile at the ITU website

Belgian male triathletes
Olympic triathletes of Belgium
Triathletes at the 2008 Summer Olympics
People from Bonheiden
1984 births
Living people
Sportspeople from Antwerp Province